In South Korea, there are about 3200 general hospitals nationwide. This list illustrates the 45 senior general hospitals (상급종합병원), which are general hospitals capable of providing high-level medical services, accredited by the ministry of health and welfare of the Republic of Korea.

List of Senior general hospitals 
All senior general hospitals serve as teaching hospitals. Names in italic represent institutions with direct affiliation with a college/school of medicine.

Seoul Metropolitan City 

 H Plus Yangji Hospital
 Asan Medical Center
 Chung-Ang University Hospital
 Ewha Womans University Mokdong Hospital  
 Gangbuk Samsung Hospital
 Hanyang University Seoul Hospital  
 Konkuk University Medical Center
 Korea University Anam Hospital  
 Kyunghee University Medical Center
 Samsung Medical Center
 Seoul National University Hospital - SNUH  
 Severance Hospital 
 The Catholic University of Korea Seoul St. Mary's Hospital 
 Yonsei University Gangnam Severance Hospital

Busan Metropolitan City 

 Dong-a University Hospital   
 Inje University Busan Paik Hospital
 Pusan National University Hospital - PNUH

Incheon Metropolitan City 

 Gachon University Gil Medical Center   
 Inha University Hospital   
 The Catholic University of Korea Incheon St. Mary's Hospital

Daegu Metropolitan City 

 Daegu Catholic University Medical Center
 Keimyung University Dongsan Hospital
 Kyongpook National University Chilgok Hospital 
 Kyongpook National University Hospital     
 Youngnam University Hospital

Gwangju Metropolitan City 

 Chonnam National University Hospital     
 Chosun University Hospital

Daejeon Metropolitan City 

 Chungnam National University Hospital (CNUH)

Ulsan Metropolitan City 

 Ulsan University Hospital

Sejong Special Self-Governing City

Gyeonggi Province 

 Ajou University Hospital 
 Hallym University Sacred Heart Hospital  
 Seoul National University Bundang Hospital - SNUBH    
 SoonChunHyang University Bucheon Hospital  
 Korea University Ansan Hospital

Kangwon Province 

 Ganneung Asan Hospital  
 Yonsei University Wonju Severance Christian Hospital

Chungcheongbuk Province 

 Chungbuk National University Hospital

Chungcheongnam Province 

 Danguk University Hospital   
 SoonChunHyang University Cheonan Hospital

Gyeongsangbuk Province

Gyeongsangnam Province 

 Gyeongsang National University Hospital - GNUH     
 Pusan National University Yangsan Hospital - PNUYH  
 Samsung Changwon Hospital

Jeollabuk Province 

 Jeonbuk National University Yangsan Hospital    
 Wonkwang University Hospital

Jeollanam Province 

 Chonnam National University Hwasun Hospital

Jeju Special Self-Governing Province 
s-jungang hospital

References

South Korea
Hospitals
South Korea